Two-stage presidential elections were held in Finland in 1925. On 15 and 16 January the public elected presidential electors to an electoral college. They in turn elected the president. The result was a victory for Lauri Kristian Relander, who won on the third ballot. The turnout for the popular vote was just 39.7%.
The outgoing president, K.J. Ståhlberg, had refused to seek a second term.  According to the late Agrarian and Centrist politician, Johannes Virolainen, he stepped down after one term because he believed that an incumbent president would be too likely to win re-election. President Ståhlberg claimed that he had already completed his political service to Finland as president. Moreover, he wanted to step down because many right-wing Finns (especially veterans of the Civil War and supporters of the Greater Finland movement) opposed him.  According to Pentti Virrankoski, a Finnish historian, President Ståhlberg hoped that his retirement would advance parliamentary politics in Finland. Ståhlberg's party, the Progressives, chose Risto Ryti, the governor of the Bank of Finland, as their presidential candidate.  The Agrarians only chose Lauri Kristian Relander as their presidential candidate in early February 1925. The National Coalitioners originally chose former Regent and Prime Minister Pehr Evind Svinhufvud as their presidential candidate, but before the presidential electors met, they replaced Svinhufvud with Hugo Suolahti, an academician working as the rector (principal) of the University of Helsinki (Heikinheimo, Ilmari, Suomen elämäkerrasto (The Biography Compilation of Finland), pg. 731, Helsinki:  Werner Söderström Publications Ltd., 1955). Relander surprised many politicians by defeating Ryti as a dark-horse presidential candidate, although he had served as the Speaker of the Finnish Parliament, and as Governor of the Province of Viipuri. Ståhlberg had quietly favoured Ryti as his successor, because he considered Ryti a principled and unselfish politician. He was disappointed with Relander's victory, and told one of his daughters that if he had known beforehand that Relander would be elected as his successor, he would have considered seeking a second term (see, for example, Sakari Virkkunen, Finland's Presidents I / Suomen presidentit I.  Helsinki:  Otava Ltd., 1994, pgs. 183-187 (Ståhlberg), pgs. 10–17;  Johannes Virolainen, The Last Electoral Term / Viimeinen vaalikausi.  Helsinki:  Otava Ltd., 1991;  Raimo Salokangas, "The Independent Republic" (Itsenäinen tasavalta), pgs. 631–632 in Seppo Zetterberg et al., eds., A Small Giant of the Finnish History / Suomen historian pikkujättiläinen.  Helsinki:  WSOY, 2003;  Pentti Virrankoski, A History of Finland / Suomen historia, volumes 1&2. Helsinki:  Finnish Literature Society (Suomalaisen kirjallisuuden seura), 2009, pgs.
791–792).

Results

Popular vote

Electoral college

References

1925
Finland
January 1925 events